Per Bak (8 December 1948 – 16 October 2002) was a Danish theoretical physicist who coauthored the 1987 academic paper that coined the term "self-organized criticality."

Life and work 
After receiving his Ph.D. from the Technical University of Denmark in 1974, Bak worked at Brookhaven National Laboratory. He specialized in phase transitions, such as those occurring when an insulator suddenly becomes a conductor or when water freezes. In that context, he also did important work on complicated spatially modulated (magnetic) structures in solids. This research led him to the more general question of how organization emerges from disorder.

In 1987, he and two postdoctoral researchers, Chao Tang and Kurt Wiesenfeld, published an article in Physical Review Letters setting a new concept they called self-organized criticality. The first discovered example of a dynamical system displaying such self-organized criticality, the Bak-Tang-Wiesenfeld sandpile model, was named after them.

Faced with many skeptics, Bak pursued the implications of his theory at a number of institutions, including the Brookhaven National Laboratory, the Santa Fe Institute, the Niels Bohr Institute in Copenhagen, and Imperial College London, where he became a professor in 2000.

In 1996, he took his ideas to a broader audience with his ambitiously titled book, How Nature Works.  In 2001, Bak learned that he had myelodysplastic syndrome and died from it the following year. 
Bak is survived by his second wife, Maya Paczuski, a fellow physicist and current professor at the University of Calgary, with whom he has coauthored papers, and his four children.

Selected publications 
 
 
 1996, How Nature Works: The Science of Self-Organized Criticality, New York: Copernicus.

References

References

1948 births
2002 deaths
Deaths from myelodysplastic syndrome
People from Brønderslev
Academics of Imperial College London
Complex systems scientists
20th-century Danish physicists
Brookhaven National Laboratory staff
Fellows of the American Physical Society